The Federal Football Netball Club was an Australian rules football and netball club in the Upper Murray Football League, the club is known as the Swans based in Corryong, Victoria. It fields all senior and junior sides as well as a netball club. The club is also notable for producing Australian Football League (AFL) players including  premiership player Adrian Whitehead. The club went into recess after the end of the 2022 season.

History 
Originally known as Mount Elliot, the club enjoyed premiership success in the Corryong Football Association, precursor of the Upper Murray Football League, on three occasions in 1895, 1897 and 1898. It then became known as the Federal Football Club, claiming further pre-world war one flags in 1901 thanks to a grand final defeat of Walwa and 1902 at the expense of Cudgewa. Over the remainder of the twentieth century Federal firmly established itself as one of the UMFL's leading clubs, claiming at least one premiership every decade.

The 1920s brought several grand final appearances but only one flag, achieved in 1925 against Walwa. Over the course of the 1930s the Swans, with a total of three premierships, all claimed in succession between 1933 and 1935, vied with Walwa as the competition's most successful club.

Federal began the post-war period by downing Walwa, 8.8 (56) to 3.9 (27), in the 1945 grand final, but there then followed an unusually long premiership drought that was not broken until 1959. The Swans overcame Corryong in that year's grand final, as they would do again the following season. Both matches were close, with Federal getting home by 10 points in the former year and 9 points in the latter.

The remainder of the 1960s saw the Swans contesting another four grand finals but only once, against Cudgewa in 1965, did they emerge victorious. The ensuing decade was altogether more successful as the side procured its second hat trick of grand final triumphs between 1975 and 1977 besides finishing second on four occasions.

The 1980s proved to be the Swans' most successful decade to date, with grand final victories over Tumbarumba in 1980, Border-Walwa in 1983, Cudgewa in 1986, Corryong in 1988, and Border-Walwa in 1989. There were also losing grand final appearances against Corryong in both 1985 and 1987.

2000 and beyond
The club had successive grand final wins in 1993 and 1994, while since the turn of the century the Swans have been grand finalists five times for victories in 2006 over Corryong and 2007 against Bullioh and in 2016 over Corryong. Overall, their record of 27 UMFL premierships places them third on the all-time list behind Corryong (31) and Cudgewa (28).

See also
Upper Murray Football Netball League
Tallangatta & District Football League
Australian rules football in Victoria
Australian rules football in New South Wales

References

External links
 
 Gameday website

Netball teams in Victoria (Australia)
Australian rules football clubs in Victoria (Australia)
1892 establishments in Australia
Australian rules football clubs established in 1892
Multi-sport clubs in Australia
Sports clubs established in 1892